Paul Goebel (born July 18, 1968) is an American actor, comedian and television presenter.

He attended the University of Arizona. He won the TV Land "Ultimate Fan Search". He is currently suffering from severe depression & anxiety which makes it difficult to leave his home.

Acting career

Beat the Geeks

He starred on the game show Beat the Geeks as the TV Geek. On the show, contestants face off in trivia matches against "geeks" who are well-versed in music, movies, and television.

Other roles
Paul has been a contestant on the game shows Race to Escape, Greed and Win Ben Stein's Money. He has also guest starred on several television series, including Curb Your Enthusiasm, Will and Grace, Boston Common, and Roswell.

He also had minor roles on numerous movies, including Not Another Teen Movie.

Podcast 
Paul hosts his own podcast, "The Paul Goebel Show."  In each episode, Paul invites a different comedian onto the show to discuss television, politics, and any other topic they decide on.

Paul has appeared on other podcasts, such as "Never Not Funny," “Fandom Planet” and "Battleship Pretension".

References

External links
TheKingofTV.com, personal site (archived)
Personal Myspace account (archived)
Paul Goebel Show Myspace account (archived)

Subscription podcast at feedburner.com
Paul Goebel interviewed on The Gentlemen's Club with Caleb Bacon

1968 births
Living people
American male television actors
American male comedians
21st-century American comedians
American podcasters
American television personalities
Male television personalities
University of Arizona alumni
Contestants on American game shows
Actors from Flint, Michigan